Northpine Christian College is an independent Seventh-day Adventist co-educational primary and secondary day school, located at Dakabin, on the north side of Brisbane of Queensland, Australia. The College is owned and operated by the Seventh-day Adventist Church, South Queensland District and is part of the Seventh-day Adventist Church's worldwide educational system.

History
Northpine Christian College has experienced many major changes since it first commenced with just 26 students in January 1940. It began in the hall at the back of the Albion Seventh-day Adventist Church in Brisbane.

As enrolments grew, a small school was established at Zillmere in 1953. Fred Brown was the first school Head Master.

In February 1978 a fire completely destroyed the school building at Zillmere. The cause of the fire was never ascertained, however, it was suspected to have started in the sports equipment room. The only item saved from the fire was the school bell, which remains on display in the front office of the current College administrative block. Mel Olsen was Head Master at the time, and, following the fire, for almost two years the school was then conducted in the 'sheds' of the Watson Park Seventh-day Adventist Convention Centre.

In August 1980, the new school buildings were officially opened at the current site. The school continued as a primary school until January 1984, when the junior secondary school commenced. Since then, the College has continued to expand with the Resource Centre opening in July 1991 and the addition of Years 11 and 12 in 1996. In 2007, the College added a Childcare & Early Learning Centre, and in 2008 the Performing Arts centre was completed and soon after, a new classroom block. In 2019, a new building with an outdoor amphitheatre was opened to provide new classrooms for the growing high school.

The College has a sister college, Noosa Christian College, at Cooroy, approximately one hour north of Dakabin.

Spiritual aspects
All students take religion classes each year that they are enrolled. These classes cover topics in biblical history and Christian and denominational doctrines. Instructors in other disciplines sometimes begin each class period with prayer or a short devotional thought, many which encourage student input. Weekly, the entire student body gathers together for an hour-long chapel service.
Outside the classrooms there is year-round spiritually oriented programming that relies on student involvement.

Sports
The Academy offers the following  sports:
Futsal (boys & girls)
Touch Rugby (boys & girls)
Basketball (boys & girls)
Volleyball (boys & girls)
Netball (girls)

See also

List of Seventh-day Adventist secondary schools
 List of schools in Queensland
 Seventh-day Adventist education

References

External links
 Northpine Christian College official website
 Queensland Education Department Schools Directory listing

Private primary schools in Queensland
Private secondary schools in Queensland
Schools in South East Queensland
Adventist secondary schools in Australia
Educational institutions established in 1980
1980 establishments in Australia
Adventist primary schools in Australia